Bamawm is a district in the Australian state of Victoria. Bamawm shares a cricket club with Lockington, their home ground is the Bamawm sports stadium.

Bamawm shares an Australian rules football team with nearby Lockington—the Lockington Bamawm United Cats—competing in the Heathcote District Football League.

References

Towns in Victoria (Australia)